The Mubarak Mosque or Masjid Mubarak is a mosque in Qadian and the first Ahmadiyya mosque. It was opened in 1883 by Mirza Ghulam Ahmad, the founder of the Ahmadiyya Movement.

Style
The entrance to the mosque has the following inscription:

مُبَارِكٌ وَّ مُبَارَكٌ وَّ كُلُّ اَمْرٍ مُّبَارَكٍ يُّجْعَلُ فِيْهِ

“This mosque is a source of blessings, is blessed itself, and every blessed deed will be performed in it.”

See also
 Islam in India

References

External links 
Photos on the alislam.org mosque gallery

Ahmadiyya mosques in India
Mosques in Punjab, India